Englewood, New Jersey was incorporated on March 17, 1899. Beginning in 1980, Englewood switched from a Mayor-Council form of government to a modified Council-Manager plan of government in accordance with a Special Charter granted by the New Jersey Legislature. Under this charter, the mayor retains appointive and veto powers, while the council acts as a legislative and policy making body, with some power to appoint and confirm appointments. The City Council consists of five members, each elected for a three-year term. Four are elected from the individual wards in which they live and the other is elected by a citywide vote as an at-large member. The city is divided into four wards which are approximately equal in population. Administrative functions are responsibilities of the City Manager. The six seats in the governing body are elected in a three-year cycle as part of the November general election, with wards two and four both up together, followed a year later by wards one and three, and then the at-large council and mayoral seats. Each ward votes in two of the three years in the cycle, once for its ward seat, in the other year for the two positions voted at-large and one year with no election. The terms begin on January 1 of year after the November election.

Mayors

References

 
Englewood